The île de Nantes (Island of Nantes) is an island located in the centre of the city of Nantes, France, surrounded by two branches of the river Loire - the "bras de la Madeleine" (branch of the Madeleine) at the north and the "bras de Pirmil" (branch of Pirmil) at the south. It is one of the eleven neighbourhoods of Nantes.

Dimensions and history 
The branches (intervening channels) were filled in during the 19th and 20th centuries. Chiefly these islands were the "île Beaulieu", "île Sainte-Anne", "île de Petite Biesse" and the "île de Grande Biesse" the more water meadow-like "prairie au Duc", "prairie d'Aval", "prairie d'Amont", "prairie de Balagué", "prairie de Pré-Joli". It is one of the most developed and well-conserved parts of the city while featuring modern buildings such as its major basketball and indoor sports venue. Many trees and flowers are on the island, which in part helped the city to be recognized as European Green Capital in 2013.

Access 
The "île de Nantes" is linked to the rest of the city by 13 bridges:
 8 bridges cross the branch of the Madeleine:
 Éric Tabarly bridge
 Résal bridge (railway bridge)
 Willy Brandt's bridge
 Aristide Briand bridge
 Général Audibert bridge
 Haudaudine bridge
 Passerelle Victor Schoelcher (pedestrian bridge)
 Anne-de-Bretagne bridge
 5 bridges cross the branch of Pirmil:
 Léopold Sédar Senghor bridge
 Georges Clemenceau bridge
 Pirmil bridge
 Pornic bridge (railway bridge with a bicycle track)
 Trois continents bridge

The Vendée's bridge is a railway bridge, which crosses the island, but there is no railway station on the island.

Locations of interest

 Machines of the Isle of Nantes
 Court of justice of Nantes
 Titan cranes
 Blockhaus DY10
 The Palais des Sports de Beaulieu
 Buren's rings
 The hangar à bananes (bananas facility)

References 

Ile
River islands of France